The DEC Hebrew character set is an 8-bit character set developed by Digital Equipment Corporation (DEC) to support the Hebrew alphabet. It was derived from DEC's Multinational Character Set (MCS) by removing the existing definitions from code points 192 to 223 and 224 to 250 and replacing code points 251 to 256 by the Hebrew letters. This range corresponds to the Hebrew range of its 7-bit counterpart, but with the high bit set.

Since MCS is a predecessor of ISO/IEC 8859-1, DEC Hebrew is similar to ISO/IEC 8859-8 and the Windows code page 1255, that is, many characters in the range 160 to 191 are the same, and the Hebrew letters are at 192 to 250 in all three character sets.

Code page layout

See also
8-bit DEC Greek (Code page 1287)
8-bit DEC Turkish (Code page 1288)
8-bit DEC Cyrillic (KOI-8 Cyrillic)
7-bit DEC Hebrew (SI 960)

References

Character sets
Digital Equipment Corporation